Ængelmaker is the twelfth studio album by Danish electro-industrial musical project Leæther Strip. It was released on March 27, 2009.

Some editions of the album include the bonus EP Yes, I'm Limited Vol. IV.

Track listing
Disc 1
 Ængelmaker
 Anger
 I Can't Sit Still
 Strap Me Down Again
 We Are Dust
 Genetic Fuckup
 Lili Marlene
 White Flag
 Dying To Live
 When You're Inside Me
 Black Celebration (Depeche Mode cover)
Disc 2
 Stolen Feæthers
 Insect Warrior
 I Will Never Hurt You Again
 Treatment
 Before I Fade
 La Danse Macabre
 Don't You Dare Die On Me
 Spinning
 So Hard They Fall
 Deliver Me (The Beloved cover)
 Blasphemous Rumours (Depeche Mode cover)
Disc 3 (bonus disc)
 Leæther Strip feat Unter Null: Don't You Want Me (Human League cover)
 Law of Jante 09 (Golem mix)
 Lovehate
 Leæther Strip vs. Supreme Court: Europa
 Leæther Strip vs. Titans: Deadhead
 Leæther Strip vs. Supreme court: Overkill
 Back in control (Bigger mix)
 Go ahead 09 (Hungarian club version)
 One nine eight two (Obamarama club mix)
 Snakebite (Black Mamba mix)
 Pain is beautiful
 Genetic fuckup (Nostalgia mix)

Leæther Strip albums
2008 albums